Tongluo Township is a rural township in Miaoli County, Taiwan.

Geography
 Area: 
 Population: 16,676 (January 2023)

Administrative divisions

The township comprises 10 villages: Chenglong, Fuxing, Jiuhu, Tongluo, Xinglong, Xinlong, Zhangshu, Zhaoyang, Zhongping and Zhusen.

Politics
The township is part of Miaoli County Constituency I electoral district for Legislative Yuan.

Economy
The township is the main producer of chrysanthemums in Taiwan.

Tourist attractions
 Hakka Yard
 Miaoli Park
 Ramune Soda Factory

Transportation

 Tongluo Station

Notable natives
 Yeh Chu-lan, Vice Premier (2004-2005)

References

External links

  

Townships in Miaoli County